Paac Ciinak is a census-designated place (CDP) in Shawano County, Wisconsin, United States. As of the 2020 census, it had a population of 83. On older federal topographic maps, the community is shown as Potch-Chee-Nunk or Potch Che Nunk.

The community is in western Shawano County, on land of the Ho-Chunk Nation of Wisconsin. It is bordered to the west by U.S. Route 45, which leads south  to Wittenberg and northwest  to Eland. The Middle Branch of the Embarrass River flows southward through the west side of the community.

References 

Populated places in Shawano County, Wisconsin
Census-designated places in Shawano County, Wisconsin
Census-designated places in Wisconsin
Ho-Chunk Nation of Wisconsin